, better known by his nickname , is a character from Sega's Sonic the Hedgehog series. Tails also appears in several spin-off games which he stars, comic books, cartoons, and films. He is the second character to consistently appear by Sonic's side in the series, appearing in nearly every mainline and spin-off since his debut. The name "Miles Prower" is a pun on "miles per hour", a reference to the famed speed of Sonic the Hedgehog. Miles Prower is a two-tailed fox, hence the nickname.

A mechanical genius and skilled pilot, he can fly by spinning his tails like a helicopter rotor and can be seen flying in multiple games and TV shows created by Sega. He debuted in November 1992 with the release of Sonic the Hedgehog 2. In the mid-1990s, he was featured as the main character in a number of spinoff games: Tails and the Music Maker for the Sega Pico, Tails Adventure and Tails' Skypatrol for the Game Gear. Tails was rated the third-most-popular character in the franchise, behind Sonic and Shadow, in an official poll from Sega in 2009.

Concept and creation
Yasushi Yamaguchi, originally the main artist and zone designer for Sega's Sonic Team, designed Tails for an internal competition for a sidekick to the speedy hedgehog. The character was inspired by a kitsune, a creature from Japanese folklore that could over time grow multiple tails. The character was also meant to hold a "deep admiration for Sonic".
 
While Yamaguchi's entry won, Sega of Japan wanted to name the character "Miles Prower" (the surname being a play on "per hour"), whereas the American subsidiary Sega of America preferred the moniker "Tails". Sega of America crafted a compelling backstory for the character to convince the Japanese parent company and Sonic Team to have him named "Tails". Yamaguchi ended up with a compromise, using "Miles Prower" as the character's real name; "Tails" would be his nickname, giving the character the full name of Miles "Tails" Prower.

The character debuted as Sonic's tag-along partner in the franchise's second game and has remained an important character since. However, the character's uniqueness was not established until Sonic the Hedgehog 3, when players were given the power to control his flying (although the AI would make Tails fly when he would get off-screen).

Tails was redesigned (along with all of the other Sonic characters) by Yuji Uekawa for Sonic Adventure. His fur changed color to a more yellow shade as opposed to the orange in his early appearances, and he gained blue irises.

In the American Sonic comic book, along with the Adventures of Sonic the Hedgehog and Sonic the Hedgehog cartoons, he was originally dark brown, but the comic artists and cartoon artists eventually decided to change this to match his in-game appearance.

Voice portrayal
Throughout the years, Tails has been voiced by several different voice actors. In the Japanese dubs, Tails was voiced by Nariko Fujieda from 1994 to 1996, Hekiru Shiina in 1996, Kazuki Hayashi in 1998, Atsuki Murata from 2000 to 2001 and by Ryō Hirohashi since 2003.

On Adventures of Sonic the Hedgehog, Tails was originally voiced by Russi Taylor in the unaired pilot, Christopher Stephen Welch would later take over and voice the character throughout the entire series, excluding the Christmas special where he was voiced by Chris Turner. He was then voiced by Bradley Pierce in Sonic the Hedgehog and then by Lainie Frasier in Sonic the Hedgehog: The Movie.

Beginning in 2003 with Sonic X, he was voiced by Amy Palant who would later take over the role in the video games, starting with Shadow the Hedgehog in 2005. Palant was replaced by Kate Higgins in 2010, beginning with Sonic Free Riders. She continued to voice the character until 2013, where her final role as Tails was in Mario & Sonic at the Sochi 2014 Olympic Winter Games, though she reprised her role in 2021 for the Sonic Colors: Rise of the Wisps miniseries. Since 2014, Tails has been voiced by Colleen O'Shaughnessey, including in the television series Sonic Boom and the two live-action films. In the 2022 Sonic short film, Sonic Drone Home, Tails is voiced by Alicyn Packard. In the Netflix series Sonic Prime, Tails is voiced by Ashleigh Ball.

Characteristics
The character of Tails is portrayed as a very gentle, comforting, and humble fox. As a longtime friend, he admires Sonic and dreams of being just like him. He wants to prove that he can be counted on, and has fought Dr. Eggman and his robots without the aid of Sonic before. He is fond of mint candy. Despite overcoming most of his fears and becoming very bold, Tails remains keraunophobic. Tails is not intended to be a selfish character and instead, is always ready and willing to help others without asking for anything in return.

Tails has been described as a mechanical prodigy who rivals Dr. Eggman but has not yet realized his full potential. Coupled with his skills as an airplane pilot, he uses a biplane nicknamed "Tornado" to assist Sonic on their adventures. Additionally, by spinning his two tails like a helicopter rotor, he has the unique ability to push himself through the air to catch up with Sonic; however, this tires him quickly, hence his use of planes. Unlike Sonic, Tails can swim. Like Sonic, he can transform into Super Tails, but he requires either the Chaos Emeralds (Sonic Mania) or the Super Emeralds (Sonic 3 and Knuckles) to transform. Also, when in this form (in Sonic 3 and Knuckles only), a swarm of Flickies circle Tails. This was seen first as what seemed to be a one-time appearance in Sonic the Hedgehog 3 & Knuckles and then again in Sonic Heroes, where alongside Team Sonic members Sonic and Knuckles, would transform themselves into their super forms.

Appearances

In video games
Tails debuted in November 1992 with the release of the Sonic the Hedgehog 2, playing the part of Sonic's sidekick. He was a playable character from the second controller and could be chosen as player one for the main game, though he did not possess the ability to fly. Sonic Chaos (1993), on the Game Gear/Master System was the second game where the player could control Tails and the first time the player could control his flight, this changed some elements on gameplay. Tails also made a minor cameo in Sonic CD for the Sega CD, appearing in the debug mode unlock screen. Tails makes an appearance alongside Sonic in the little known arcade game, SegaSonic Popcorn Shop, a Japanese arcade game which also dispenses popcorn after playing the game.

Tails made his third major appearance in the 1994 game, Sonic 3 (& Knuckles), with the ability to pick up Sonic and use his tails to fly him to other areas rotating his tails like a helicopter. He also gained the ability to swim under water, something Sonic has never been able to do. This is also first time you can control tails' flight in a Sega Genesis game.

Tails has also starred in games without Sonic, such as Tails' Skypatrol, which is a side-scrolling score attack like game for the Game Gear released exclusively in Japan. This was followed by Tails Adventures later the same year, which is a Metroid-esque platformer with RPG elements. Tails is also the star of Tails and the Music Maker for the Sega Pico.

Tails was intended to appear in the Sega 32X game Knuckles' Chaotix, but was scrapped during development. Leftover data of him still remains in the game, and can be played as by using a cheat code.

In later games, Tails had roles that require unique modes of play including Sonic Adventure, where he appears as one of the six playable characters. His gameplay is based around standard platforming stages, but the goal of each stage is to get to the Chaos Emerald before Sonic, or to the missile dud in the final race against Eggman. In Sonic Adventure 2, he is featured in third-person-shooting segments, seated in his "Cyclone" mech. These stages, along with Dr. Eggman's shooting levels in the same game, were very similar to the E-102 Gamma levels of Sonic Adventure. In Sonic Adventure, he was given a theme song "Believe In Myself", of which another version appeared in Sonic Adventure 2.

Tails also appeared either as a playable character or in a supporting role in many later Sonic titles and still often resumes his role flying other characters around, such as in Sonic Heroes, where Tails appears on Team Sonic as their flight-type character, being capable of carrying both Sonic and Knuckles the Echidna.

Tails is seen in the background of Green Hill Zone along with Silver and Knuckles in Super Smash Bros. Brawl, and also appears as a trophy, he makes an appearance in the game's two sequels as well. He is the third character the player unlocks in Sonic Chronicles: The Dark Brotherhood, where he acts as a team medic.

Tails appears in Sonic Unleashed, where he helps Sonic restore the shattered planet, largely by flying Sonic from continent to continent in the game.

Tails takes a supporting role in Sonic and the Black Knight, portrayed as a local blacksmith who helps players craft goods from the items Sonic collects.

He appears as a playable character in all of the Mario & Sonic titles, as well as in Sega Superstars Tennis, Sonic & Sega All-Stars Racing, and Transformed. He also appears in Sonic Colors as a non-playable character.

Tails celebrates Sonic's birthday along with his friends by setting up a party in Sonic Generations, but when the Time Eater appears, it warps them through various time holes, sending Tails to Green Hill. After Sonic frees him, Tails meets his classic counterpart (Classic Tails) and concludes that they were traveling through time and space. They accompany both Sonics throughout the game, later discovering that Eggman and Robotnik are controlling the Time Eater. Both Classic and Modern Tails, along with all of Sonic's friends, help motivate the 2 Sonics to defeat the Time Eater.

The feature to play as Tails was added to the 2011 enhanced port of Sonic CD. He later appeared as a co-op character in the second episode of Sonic 4.

Tails was added as a playable character in the enhanced port of Sonic the Hedgehog released in 2013 for mobile devices. The port also has the option to play the "Sonic and Tails" mode as well.

Sonic and Tails end up facing a group of villains allied with Dr. Eggman, called the Deadly Six when they were shot down while chasing him in the Tornado in Sonic Lost World. They run into Eggman and notice him wielding a Cacophonic Conch to control the Deadly Six. Despite Tails' warnings, Sonic knocks away the conch, causing the Deadly Six to betray him. Eggman reluctantly teams up with Sonic and Tails to stop them. This causes numerous conflicts between Tails and Eggman and increases tension with his friendship with Sonic since Sonic believes Eggman is their only hope in defeating the Deadly Six. Eventually, Tails gets captured in a trap intended for Sonic, and the Deadly Six plan to use this to their advantage by turning Tails into a robot. However, Tails manages to reprogram the computer that would control his mind. The seemingly-roboticized Tails confronts Sonic at the game's final stage, but by retaining his free will, he takes the Deadly Six by surprise and attacks them. Later on, after Sonic defeats Eggman at the game's climax, Sonic apologizes to Tails for doubting him. Tails forgives him and the two return home.

He is a playable character in the video game Sonic Mania (Plus), playing like his older incarnations along with Sonic, Knuckles, Mighty and Ray.

Tails appears as a playable character in the games Sonic Boom: Rise of Lyric, Shattered Crystal and Fire & Ice.

Tails was also featured in the Sonic the Hedgehog Level Pack of Lego Dimensions. He is also playable if the player uses the Tornado as Sonic to fly around the world. In the story mode for the Sonic level titled "Sonic Dimensions", Tails assists Sonic using the Tornado and his technological knowledge. In the hub world, Tails has a side quest for the player to aid him in disabling all of Eggman's roboticizers.

Tails is a supporting non-playable character in Sonic Forces, finding Classic Sonic and joining up with the resistance in opposing Dr. Eggman and Infinite.

In Sonic Frontiers, Tails along with Amy and Knuckles are trapped in Cyberspace, with Sonic releasing their digital form from cages and they help him find the Chaos Emeralds and set them free. While having a moment with Sonic, Tails expresses his self-doubt and belief that he is a burden to Sonic who is always rescuing him during crises and that his helpfulness is wildly inconsistent, but Sonic comforts him by reminding Tails of his own achievements and abilities and that needing help sometimes is part of growing up, this strengthens Tails' resolve to go solo for a while and become a hero in his own right.

He also appears as a downloadable Mii Fighter costume in the crossover fighting games Super Smash Bros. for Nintendo 3DS and Wii U and Ultimate, as well as being featured as a Spirit in the latter.

In other media
Tails is a supporting character in the animated series Adventures of Sonic the Hedgehog, Sonic the Hedgehog, Sonic X and Sonic Boom, as well as the 1996 Sonic the Hedgehog film. Tails also makes a guest appearance in the OK K.O.! Let's Be Heroes episode "Let's Meet Sonic". Tails as well as alternative versions of him appear in Sonic Prime, all of them voiced by Ashleigh Ball, after Sonic shatters the Paradox Prism and the universe, creating alternative dimensions in the process, several alternative Tails are also created, one being Nine, who never met a Sonic and was bullied throughout his life, becoming bitter and isolated and created seven artificial tails for himself as weapons, he is initially distrustful of Sonic but eventually warms up to him, allowing Sonic to bond with him like he did with the original Tails, as such Nine provides Sonic with the gear that enables him to properly use the Prism energy that is left within him. Other versions are the feral and seemingly unintelligent Mangey and the pirate mechanic Sails. In print, he is a supporting character in the Comics-produced Sonic the Hedgehog comic series as well as the Fleetway-produced Sonic the Comic.

Tails appears in the 2020 Sonic the Hedgehog film during a mid-credits sequence, emerging from a ring portal onto Earth in search of Sonic. Early drafts for the film featured Tails in a bigger role, with some drafts featuring him as Sonic's best friend in his world, as in the games, while another draft featured him as one of the main characters in the film. However, when it was decided to center the film's storyline on Sonic being alone on Earth, the filmmakers decided to use Tails as a teaser for a sequel through a cameo in the film's mid-credits scene, a role co-writer Pat Casey compared to Nick Fury's role in the Marvel Cinematic Universe.

Tails is featured as a main character in the sequel, Sonic the Hedgehog 2, the logo of which features an orange "2" with two tails attached in homage to the character. He is voiced by Colleen O'Shaughnessey, reprising her role from the games. In the film, Tails was shunned on his home planet for having two tails, but grew to idolize Sonic after witnessing his bravery when facing off against Dr. Robotnik. He travels to the planet to warn Sonic about Knuckles hunting him down to locate the Master Emerald and teams up with his hero to find the Emerald first. He assists Sonic with his flight and various gadgets throughout their journey, culminating in them teaming up with Knuckles to stop Robotnik from conquering the universe. After they succeed, they agree to safeguard the Master Emerald as they live together with Sonic's adoptive family, the Wachowskis.

Reception and legacy
Reception to Tails has been widely positive. He was awarded "Best New Character" in Electronic Gaming Monthlys 1992 video game awards, stating "not only is he as cute as Sonic, but he actually serves a major purpose in the game." IGN editor Lucas M. Thompson listed Tails as one of the Sonic the Hedgehog characters who should be in Super Smash Bros. Brawl, citing his importance in the series and his abilities. IGN editor Levi Buchanan stated that the fan response to Tails' introduction was favorable, which led to further introductions such as Knuckles. Unlike most Sonic characters, Tails has received consistently positive opinions from the Sonic fanbase over the years.

Tails is remembered for helping Sonic 2 become the second-highest-selling game for the Genesis through allowing a second player to join the game. He has been featured on many "Top Sidekicks" lists. Maximum PC listed him as their third-greatest sidekick, Machinima.com ranked him fifth, and Maxim listed him as the eighth-most-underrated sidekick. Ranking him as the sixth-greatest, Mashable stated that Tails "pretty much embodies the definition of 'sidekick'". Sonic and Tails were together ranked as IGN's ninth-greatest gaming duo. Morgan Sleeper of NintendoLife called Tails "one of Sega's most beloved mascots".

However, IGN staff writer Levi Buchanan stated that when SEGA noticed the popularity of Tails, and, later, Knuckles, they "just kept stuffing new faces and names into the game, pulling attention away from their hero." GameDaily listed the "annoying sidekick" in their top 25 video game archetypes list, citing Tails as an example of this. GamesRadar+ listed him as number one on their list of cutesy characters they wanted to beat up, stating that while he started out as interesting, he led to the creation of other characters who "choked the life out the franchise". They cited him being a "know-it-all" in later games as to why they hate him so much. Official Nintendo Magazine listed him as the second-best Sonic character.

See also
 Foxes in popular culture, films and literature
 Fox spirit
 Kumiho

References

External links

Tails at Sonic-City (archived)
Tails at Sonic Channel 

Animal superheroes
Anthropomorphic foxes
Animal characters in video games
Anthropomorphic video game characters
Child characters in film
Child characters in video games
Fictional aviators
Fictional inventors in video games
Fictional mechanics
Fictional scientists in video games
Male characters in video games
Orphan characters in video games
Sega protagonists
Sonic the Hedgehog characters
Video game characters introduced in 1992
Video game characters who can move at superhuman speeds
Video game sidekicks
Video game superheroes